Viggianello is a town and comune in the province of Potenza, in the Southern Italian region of Basilicata.

References

Cities and towns in Basilicata